The Isabella Indian Reservation is the primary land base of the federally recognized Saginaw Chippewa Tribal Nation, located in Isabella County in the central part of the U.S. state of Michigan. Tribal lands are held in trust by the federal government on behalf of the nation. 
  
The tribe owns and operates the Soaring Eagle Casino & Resort in Mount Pleasant and the Saganing Eagles Landing Casino in Standish.

The Tribe entered into an agreement with the state to expand its law enforcement jurisdiction to enforce laws on its members. This expanded area is for law enforcement on its members only and not the Mt. Pleasant community as a whole.

Communities
Beal City (in Nottawa Township)
Loomis (in Wise Township)
Mount Pleasant (part, population 8,741)
Rosebush (in Isabella Township)
Weidman (part in Nottawa Township, population 292)

Townships
All townships are in Isabella County, except Standish Township, which is in Arenac County
Chippewa Township (part)
Deerfield Township
Denver Township
Isabella Township
Mount Pleasant (part; city that is not included in any other township)
Nottawa Township
Standish Township, Arenac County (very small parts of the township)
Union Township (part)
Wise Township

References

External links
Saginaw Chippewa Indian Tribe
Native Americans in Michigan Databases, Mainly Michigan website, includes "Durant Roll of 1908" and "Mt. Pleasant Indian School Register (1893 to 1932)"

Geography of Isabella County, Michigan
Ojibwe in the United States
Anishinaabe reservations and tribal-areas in the United States
American Indian reservations in Michigan